Lafayette High School is a high school (grades 9–12) in St. Joseph, Missouri. It was established in 1917 (originally as "North High School"), and at the time was the third high school in the city.  it has an enrollment of some 800 students.

References

External links

Midland Empire Conference
Buildings and structures in St. Joseph, Missouri
High schools in Buchanan County, Missouri
Public high schools in Missouri
1917 establishments in Missouri